Ronald L. Iman is an American statistician. He was one of the developers of the statistical technique known as Latin hypercube sampling.

Books

 A Data-Based Approach to Statistics (1994)
 A Data-Based Approach to Statistics: Concise Version (1995)
 Modern Business Statistics with W. J. Conover, 2e (1989)
 Modern Business Statistics with W. J. Conover, (1983)
 Introduction to Modern Business Statistics with W. J. Conover, (1983)
 A Modern Approach to Statistics with W. J. Conover, (1983)

References

American statisticians
Presidents of the American Statistical Association
Fellows of the American Statistical Association
Living people
Mathematicians from New Mexico
20th-century American mathematicians
21st-century American mathematicians
Kansas State University alumni
Place of birth missing (living people)
Year of birth missing (living people)